McKenna is an American drama television series that aired on ABC from September 15, 1994, to July 20, 1995. It starred Chad Everett and Jennifer Love Hewitt.

The series revolved around Brick McKenna (Eric Close), who returned to Oregon to take over his brother's business, McKenna Outfitters, after his death.  He runs the business with his brother's widow, Leigh (Shawn Huff), and his father, Jack (Chad Everett).  His sister, Cassidy "Cass" (Jennifer Love Hewitt), and his niece and nephew, Rose and Harry, help out.

Production
Although thirteen episodes were filmed, only five aired in the US.  Three during September 1994, and the other two in July 1995. The series was broadcast in its entirety in Australia on the Nine Network (and its affiliate NBN Television).

The series was shot in and around Bend, Oregon.

Jennifer Love Hewitt was not cast until after the pilot episode was filmed. In the pilot, which aired as the first episode, her character was played by Vinessa Shaw.

Cast
Eric Close as Brick McKenna
Jennifer Love Hewitt as Cassidy "Cass" McKenna (role was played by Vinessa Shaw in the pilot) 
Rick Peters as Dale Goodwin
Shawn Huff as Leigh McKenna 
Jacob Loyst as Harry McKenna
Jack Kehler as Walter Maddock 
Ashlee Lauren as Rose McKenna
Chad Everett as Jack McKenna
Steve Buckley Stunt Coordinator

Episodes

External links
 
 

1990s American drama television series
1994 American television series debuts
1995 American television series endings
American Broadcasting Company original programming
English-language television shows
Television shows set in Oregon
Television series by Disney–ABC Domestic Television